The Johannes Parlaman House is a historic house located at 15 Vreeland Avenue in the township of Montville in Morris County, New Jersey. The oldest section was built . It was added to the National Register of Historic Places on January 17, 1992, for its significance in architecture. The house was listed as part of the Dutch Stone Houses in Montville, New Jersey Multiple Property Submission (MPS).

See also
 National Register of Historic Places listings in Morris County, New Jersey
 List of the oldest buildings in New Jersey

References

External links
 
 
 

Montville, New Jersey
Houses in Morris County, New Jersey
Houses on the National Register of Historic Places in New Jersey
National Register of Historic Places in Morris County, New Jersey
1755 establishments in New Jersey
New Jersey Register of Historic Places
Historic American Buildings Survey in New Jersey
Stone houses in New Jersey
Houses completed in 1755